General Baldissera is a town in Córdoba Province, Argentina. Situated in Marcos Juárez Department it has 2,133 inhabitants according to the 2001 census. It lies on Provincial Route RP E58, at 320 km (199 mi) from the provincial capital and 530 km (329 mi) from Buenos Aires.

The area's economy is mainly based in agriculture and cattle raising.

Notables 

 Ignacio Piatti, Soccer player
 Juan Pablo Vojvoda, manager

External links
 Official website

Populated places in Córdoba Province, Argentina